José Luis Meza (born September 24, 1984 in Zamora-Chinchipe) is a boxer from Ecuador who qualified for the Olympics 2008 at light-flyweight.

Career
Meza is the youngest of 10 brothers. 	
In the qualifier he beat every opponent including the decorated Odilion Zaleta to make it to Beijing. There he lost his first bout 8:14 to Paddy Barnes (Boxing at the 2008 Summer Olympics – Light flyweight).

External links
 Qualifier

1984 births
Living people
Light-flyweight boxers
Olympic boxers of Ecuador
Boxers at the 2008 Summer Olympics
Ecuadorian male boxers
People from Zamora-Chinchipe Province
21st-century Ecuadorian people